Stjepan Kovačević (Hungarian: István Kovacsevics; 1841 – 25 April 1913) was a Croatian politician, who served as Minister without portfolio of Croatian Affairs between 1905 and 1906.

References
 Magyar Életrajzi Lexikon

1841 births
1913 deaths
People from Tovarnik
Croatian politicians
Ministers of Croatian Affairs of Hungary